Francisco de Ceballos or Cevallos, Zavallos (died c. 1571) was a Spanish Renaissance composer.

He was "maestro" at Burgos Cathedral from 1535 to his death in 1571. He probably was not the brother of Rodrigo de Ceballos.

Works
Surviving works include a mass in the Cathedral of Zaragoza, diverse works in the Cathedral of Malaga, and Bogota.

References

1520s births
1570s deaths
Renaissance composers
Spanish classical composers
Spanish male classical composers